Mamdouh Abdulmonaim Muhammad Abdelrehim  (born 5 August 1989) is an Egyptian volleyball player. He was part of the Egypt men's national volleyball team at the 2014 FIVB Volleyball Men's World Championship and 2016 Summer Olympics.

References

External links
 

1989 births
Living people
Egyptian men's volleyball players
Volleyball players at the 2016 Summer Olympics
Olympic volleyball players of Egypt